On 21 June 2006, when approaching Jumla Airport, Nepal, a Yeti Airlines DHC-6 Twin Otter crashed into the ground after the crew decided to abort the landing and perform a go-around for an unknown reason. Eyewitnesses said that the plane appeared to have stalled while making a tight turn on the threshold of runway 27 and ploughed into the ground in a ball of fire on the eastern edge of the runway.

Aircraft 
The aircraft involved in the crash was a de Havilland Canada DHC-6 Twin Otter operated by Yeti Airlines. Its maiden flight was in 1980 with Lesotho Airways. The aircraft was purchased by Yeti Airlines one year prior to the accident from another Nepalese carrier, Skyline Airways. It was the third incident of this aircraft operated by Yeti Airlines and was one of four Twin Otters in the airline's fleet.

Crew and passengers 
There were six passengers on board the aircraft as well as three crew members. All occupants on board died in the crash. The cockpit crew members were identified as Captain Krishna Malla and co-pilot Dipak Pokhrel. Pokhrel's wife, Anju Khatiwada, died as the co-pilot of Yeti Airlines Flight 691 in 2023, after her husband's death inspired her to take up a career in aviation.

References 

Aviation accidents and incidents in 2006
Aviation accidents and incidents in Nepal
2006 in Nepal
June 2006 events in Asia
Accidents and incidents involving the de Havilland Canada DHC-6 Twin Otter
2006 disasters in Nepal
Yeti Airlines accidents and incidents